Red Spears' uprising in Shandong may refer to several rebellions by the Red Spear Society throughout the history of the Republic of China (1912–1949). Some of the most notable ones were:

 Red Spears rebelled at the Shandong-Hebei-Henan border in 1924, and continued to resist both warlord forces as well as the Nationalist government in this region until the 1930s
 A major rebellion against Zhang Zongchang in western Shandong in 1926
 The Red Spears' uprising in Shandong (1928–1929) against Liu Zhennian, the ruler of eastern Shandong at the time

References

Bibliography